John William Arthur was a Scottish rugby football player.

Rugby career
John W. Arthur represented Scotland in 1871 in the first international match. He was capped again on the return fixture the following year. He also played for Glasgow Academicals.

Family

He was the brother of Sir Allan Arthur, who was also capped for Scotland.

His son, Dr. J. W. Arthur, played for London Scottish, and was later ordained as a missionary to go to British South Africa.

References
 Bath, Richard (ed.) The Scotland Rugby Miscellany (Vision Sports Publishing Ltd, 2007 )

1848 births
1921 deaths
Scottish rugby union players
Scotland international rugby union players
Glasgow Academicals rugby union players
Glasgow District (rugby union) players
Rugby union players from Glasgow